Jaballah is a common Arabic surname. Notable people with the surname include:

Faicel Jaballah (born 1988), Tunisian judoka 
Jihed Jaballah (born 1989), Tunisian handball player 
Khadija Jaballah, Tunisian paralympic athlete
Mahmoud Jaballah, Egyptian-Canadian detained in Canada without charge on a "security certificate" for alleged association with terrorism
Sabri Jaballah (born 1973), Tunisian football player